Here is the list of places represented/mentioned in the Persian epic poem Shāhnāma by Ferdowsi:

Irān and Turān 
 Amol
 Kābol
 Zabolestān
 Balkh
 Estakhr
 Madāyen
 Tamishah
 Sistān
 Nimruz
 Herāt
 Bost
 Kunduz
 Ghazni
 Bāmyān
 Kandahār
 Merv
 Zibad
 Gharchagān
 Tāleqān
 Fāryāb
 Bokhārā
 Kashmir
 Andarāb
 Panjhir
 Termez
 Khatlan
 Badakhshān
 Gowzgānān
 Azarābādgān
 Pārs
 Ahvāz
 Rey
 Damghan
 Moolian
 Soghd
 Māy
 Margh
 Ermān
 Alānān
 Ghannoj
 Baghdad
 Baytolmoghaddas/Dez Hookht Kang
 Tātār
 Toor
 Danbar/Danbal
 Dahestān
 Roodābad
 Sāri
 Sebenjab/Sepijab
 Sagsār
 Shir
 Shirkhān
 Terāz
 Toos
 Kermān
 Gorzbān
 Gorgān
 Goorāb/Goorābad/Goorābe
 Māvaronnahr
 Ardabil
 Esfahān
 Khorāsān
 Khazar
 Samarghand
 Gilān
 Makrān
 Neshāboor
 Gorganj
 Jahrom
 Halab
 Iraq
 Daylam
 Ram Ardashir
 Gundishapur
 Samangan (not to be confused with today Samangan Province)
 Siavashgerd
 Khotan

Plains 
 Dasht-e Sovārān-e Neyze-gozār
 Dasht-e Ghahtān
 Dasht-e Gordān
 Dasht-e Yalān

Mounts 
 Damavand
 Alborzkouh
 Hendoukesh (also referred to as Hendoukouh)
 Sepidkouh
 Kooh-e Sepand
 Dābe kooh/Rābeh kooh

Rivers 
 Jayhoon (also referred to as Amoodarya)
 Helmand
 Kāse rood
 Arvandrood
 Darya-ye Chin
 Darya-ye Bikand
 Darya-ye Gilan
 Roode Rey
 Draya-ye Send

Other 
 Mazandaran (not to be confused with today Mazandaran Province)
 Hamavaran (possibly Himyarite Kingdom)
 Mesr
 Barbar
 Barbaristan
 Rûm
 Yemen
 Chin
 Hend
 Andalos
 Babel
 Bahrain
 Makke
 Jeddah
 Nile
 Gorgsārān
 Shām

See also 
 List of Shahnameh characters
 Persian literature
 Persian mythology

References 

Places in Shahnameh